Jared Linn Wells (born October 31, 1981 in Freeport, Texas) is a professional baseball pitcher who is currently a free agent. He appeared briefly in Major League Baseball (MLB) with the San Diego Padres in 2008.

Professional career

San Diego Padres
That year, Wells was assigned to the Short-Season A Eugene Emeralds. He had a record of 4-6 with a 2.75 ERA. The ERA was good enough for seventh lowest among Northwest League starters.

In  Wells was sent up to the Single-A Fort Wayne Wizards. He compiled a 4-6 record with 4.09 ERA in 14 starts. This soon earned him a promotion to the Advanced-A Lake Elsinore Storm there he had a record of 4-6 with a 4.52 ERA in 12 starts.

He went 13-8 with a 3.68 ERA in a combined 163 innings between the two clubs, tied for the lead among Padres' farmhands in wins, while his ERA ranked fourth. Wells captured the California League ERA title and was named the league's Pitcher of the Year. Wells was named the Padres Minor League Pitcher of the Year at the club's annual organization postseason Awards Dinner on November 3.

Wells split the  season between Double-A Mobile and the Triple-A Portland Beavers, Wells combined record was 6-12 with a 5.16 ERA in 27 starts. In 12 games at Mobile, went 4-3 with a 2.64 ERA. Wells was promoted to Triple-A on June 17 where he struggled with a 2-9 record with a 7.27 ERA.

In  Wells saw consistent action at the Triple-A level with Portland but struggled in his transition to the bullpen. Wells went 2-9 with a 5.24 ERA. He also recorded nine saves.

 was again a disappointing season for Wells, he had a 1-1 record with a 5.85 ERA. Even though his performance was sub-par, he was called up for the first time in his career on May 22, and made his major league debut with the Padres on May 24.

Seattle Mariners
After just one more appearance with the Padres, he was traded to the Mariners on May 28 for Cha Seung Baek and was assigned to Triple-A Tacoma Rainiers. He was called up by the Mariners on July 10, but optioned to the Rainiers when Félix Hernández was activated the next day.

Colorado Rockies
On February 5, 2012, Wells signed a minor league contract with the Colorado Rockies.

Sugar Land Skeeters
Wells has pitched for the Sugar Land Skeeters of the Atlantic League of Professional Baseball.

References

External links

1981 births
Living people
San Diego Padres players
Seattle Mariners players
Baseball players from Texas
Major League Baseball pitchers
People from Freeport, Texas
Tyler Junior College alumni
San Jacinto Central Ravens baseball players
Eugene Emeralds players
Lake Elsinore Storm players
Fort Wayne Wizards players
Mobile BayBears players
Portland Beavers players
Tacoma Rainiers players
West Tennessee Diamond Jaxx players
Round Rock Express players
Corpus Christi Hooks players
Colorado Springs Sky Sox players
Sugar Land Skeeters players